Jesper Mattson (born August 4, 1995) is a Swedish ice hockey defenceman. He currently plays for Leksands IF of the Swedish Hockey League (SHL).

Mattson made his Swedish Hockey League debut playing with Leksands IF during the 2014–15 SHL season.

References

External links

1995 births
Living people
Leksands IF players
Swedish ice hockey defencemen